The Locust Grove Historic District, in Locust Grove, Georgia, is a  historic district which was listed on the National Register of Historic Places in 2016.

It is centered on GA 42/US 23 between Hi-Hope Dr. & Grove Rd.  The district includes 157 contributing buildings, a contributing structure, and two contributing sites, as well as 76 non-contributing buildings.

It includes:

References

External links

Historic districts on the National Register of Historic Places in Georgia (U.S. state)
Victorian architecture in Georgia (U.S. state)
Henry County, Georgia